Presidential elections were held in Colombia on 29 May 2022, with a runoff on 19 June 2022 as no candidate obtained at least 50% in the first round of voting. Iván Duque, who was elected president in 2018, was ineligible to run due to term limits. Gustavo Petro, a senator and former Mayor of Bogota, defeated Rodolfo Hernández Suárez, former Mayor of Bucaramanga, in the runoff election. Petro's victory made him the first left-wing candidate to be elected president of Colombia, and his running mate, Francia Márquez, is the first Afro-Colombian elected to the vice-presidency, as well as the second female vice-president overall.

The elections were held in the aftermath of the 2021 Colombian protests amid poor economic conditions during the country's COVID-19 pandemic. Petro, a former AD/M-19 member who was defeated by Duque by over ten percentage points in 2018, was chosen as a candidate of the Historic Pact for Colombia alliance. Petro's left-wing platform encompassed support for land reform, universal health care, continuing the Colombian peace process, and expanding social services.

Hernández, an independent affiliated with the League of Anti-Corruption Governors, ran a populist campaign that emphasized support for law and order policies and anti-corruption efforts. Hernández experienced a surge in support in the final weeks of the campaign, which allowed him to overtake conservative candidate Federico Gutiérrez for a spot in the runoff. This surge in popularity was partially credited to his substantial social media following and TikTok videos, which led him to be dubbed the "king of TikTok".

Petro won the runoff with 50.42% of the vote to Hernández's 47.35%. Petro dominated in regions on Colombia's Caribbean and Pacific coasts, and received over 81% of the vote in the coastal department of Chocó. Due to an increased turnout among his supporters, Petro received nearly 2.7 million more votes in the second round than the first. The result was noted for a continuing trend of left-wing victories in Latin America, which has been dubbed as a "new pink tide".

Background

During the previous election held in 2018, a run-off took place as no candidate attained 50% of the vote. The top two candidates were senator Iván Duque of the Democratic Center party and Humane Colombia nominee Gustavo Petro, a former Mayor of Bogotá and a former AD/M-19 member. The election's issues included the FARC peace agreement, corruption, unemployment, and healthcare. Duque defeated Petro by over ten percentage points; however, there were subsequent allegations of fraud and irregularities. As the runner up, Petro became a senator per the Legislative Act No. 2 of 2015.

Widespread demonstrations against the policies of president Duque took place from late April to December 2021. Amid the COVID-19 pandemic in Colombia, which had dealt a blow to the economy and at a time when unemployment rates were high, Duque proposed a tax increase. Furthermore, a controversial bill was proposed in Congress that would have resulted in the privatization of healthcare. The majority of the protests were peaceful, with some cases of vandalism. According to human-rights groups, police reacted violently to protesters in various instances, leading to deaths and alleged cases of sexual assault. The protests led to a withdrawal of the healthcare and tax reform bills and the resignation of finance minister Alberto Carrasquilla Barrera.

Electoral system

Colombian presidents are elected for four-year terms using a two-round system; if no candidate receives a majority of the vote in the first round, a runoff is held between the top two candidates. The vice president is elected on the same ticket as the president. Presidents are limited to a single four-year term and Article 191 of the constitution requires candidates to be Colombian by birth and at least thirty years old. In line with the constitution, Colombian citizens by birth or by naturalization, aged eighteen or older have the right to vote. Several scenarios can cause the loss of the right to vote, as outlined in the constitution. Citizens in detention centers can vote from the establishments determined by the National Civil Registry. The civil registry inscription is not automatic, and citizens must go to the regional office of the registry to register. Legislative Act No. 2 of 2015 established that the runner-up in the presidential elections is given a seat in the Senate and their vice president candidate becomes a member of the Chamber of Representatives.

In order to be accepted as a candidate, applicants must either have the backing of a recognized political party in order to run as their official candidate, or to collect a minimum number of signatures in order to run as an independent candidate. The National Registry confirmed that the minimum number of signatures required was 580,620, equivalent to 3% of the total valid vote in the 2018 Colombian presidential election, and that they had to be delivered to the registry by 17 December 2021. On 17 December, the National Registry confirmed that seven pre-candidates had delivered the necessary number of signatures: Alejandro Char, Rodolfo Hernández, Federico Gutiérrez, Alejandro Gaviria, Luis Pérez, Roy Barreras, and Juan Carlos Echeverry. Of these seven pre-candidates, Char, Gutiérrez, and Gaviria accepted the endorsements of political parties, thereby bypassing the necessity to run as independents, while Barreras and Echeverry later decided to drop out of the presidential race; this left Hernández and Pérez as the only independent candidates in the race.

Primaries and party conventions

Historic Pact for Colombia
The Historic Pact for Colombia (Spanish: Pacto Histórico por Colombia) is a coalition of left-wing, progressive, and Indigenous politicians. Five pre-candidates representing six political parties or movements announced that they would be standing for election as the unified presidential candidate for the coalition. The candidate was chosen by public vote on 13 March 2022.

The candidates were:
 Gustavo Petro, senator, former mayor of Bogota, and runner-up in the 2018 Colombian presidential election (Humane Colombia; Patriotic Union)
 Francia Márquez, Afro-Colombian human-rights and environmental activist (Alternative Democratic Pole)
 Camilo Romero, former governor of Nariño (Greens for Change)
 , Wayuu community leader (Indigenous and Social Alternative Movement)
 Alfredo Saade, evangelical pastor (Broad Democratic Alliance)

Primary results

Petro was announced as the winner of the public vote and was nominated to be the candidate of the Historic Pact for Colombia coalition.

Hope Center Coalition
The Hope Center Coalition (Spanish: Coalición Centro Esperanza), formerly known as the Coalition of Hope (Spanish: Coalición de la Esperanza) until 28 November 2021, is a coalition of centre and centre-left politicians. Five pre-candidates announced that they would be standing for election as the unified presidential candidate for the coalition. The candidate was chosen by public vote on 13 March 2022.

The candidates were:
 Juan Manuel Galán, former senator (New Liberalism)
 Sergio Fajardo, former mayor of Medellín (Independent Social Alliance)
 Jorge Enrique Robledo, senator (Dignity)
 Carlos Amaya, former governor of Boyacá (We Are Green Hope)
 Alejandro Gaviria, former Minister of Health and Social Protection (Colombia Has a Future)

Primary results

Fajardo was announced as the winner of the public vote and was nominated to be the candidate of the Hope Center Coalition.

Team for Colombia Coalition
The Team for Colombia Coalition (Spanish: Coalición Equipo por Colombia) is a coalition of centre-right and right-wing politicians. Five pre-candidates announced that they would be standing for election as the unified presidential candidate for the coalition. The candidate was chosen by public vote on 13 March 2022.

The candidates were:
 Aydeé Lizarazo (Independent Movement of Absolute Renovation)
 Alejandro Char, former mayor of Barranquilla (Land of Opportunities)
 David Barguil, senator (Colombian Conservative Party)
 Enrique Peñalosa, former mayor of Bogota (Party of the U)
 Federico Gutiérrez, former mayor of Medellín (We Believe Colombia)

Primary results

Gutiérrez was announced as the winner of the public vote and was nominated to be the candidate of the Team for Colombia Coalition.

Other candidates
 Rodolfo Hernández, former mayor of Bucaramanga (League of Anti-Corruption Governors). Hernández announced on 29 June 2021 that he would run as an independent candidate. On 13 December 2021, Hernández announced that he had delivered nearly 1.9 million signatures to the National Registry in support of his candidacy.
 John Milton Rodríguez, senator (Fair and Free Colombia). Rodríguez was chosen as the candidate of the evangelical Christian party Fair and Free Colombia (Spanish: Colombia Justa Libres) at the party's national convention in November 2021, obtaining 75% of the delegates' votes.
 Enrique Gómez Martínez (National Salvation Movement). On 1 November 2021, Gómez Martínez announced that he was relaunching the conservative National Salvation Movement (Spanish: Movimiento Salvación Nacional) that had been founded by his late uncle Álvaro Gómez Hurtado. On 1 December 2021, the National Registry accepted the return of the National Salvation Movement as a political party, and Gómez Martínez became the party's presidential candidate.

Candidates

Summary of candidates
The following candidates registered with the National Registrar of Civil Status and appeared on the ballot of the first round. This list also displays the most recent political office held by each candidate.

Candidates not in the runoff

Withdrew
Óscar Iván Zuluaga, former Minister of Finance and Public Credit and runner-up in the 2014 Colombian presidential election (Democratic Center). It was announced that the candidate for the right wing Democratic Center party would be chosen via two polls conducted internally during November 2021. The polls were conducted by the two polling agencies Centro Nacional de Consultoría (CNC) and YanHass via telephone, and polled 2,100 party members (comprising 25% of the final weighting) and 2,100 members of the public (comprising the remaining 75% weighting). In both polls Zuluaga emerged comfortably as the preferred candidate, winning 53% of the vote in the CNC poll and 52% of the vote in the YanHass poll, and he was announced as the Democratic Center's candidate on 22 November 2021. He beat four other pre-candidates: María Fernanda Cabal (23% and 27% in the CNC and YanHass polls, respectively), Paloma Valencia (11% and 9%), Alirio Barrera (8% and 7%), and Rafael Nieto Loiaza (5% and 5%). The result of the vote caused controversy, with Cabal in particular disputing the results of the polls and accusing current president Iván Duque (also of the Democratic Center party) of interfering with the voting process to ensure that Zuluaga would win. Following his victory, Zuluaga was invited to join the Team for Colombia Coalition, but he originally declined the invitation. However, following Federico Gutiérrez's nomination as the Team for Colombia candidate, Zuluaga withdrew his candidacy and stated that he would support Gutiérrez's campaign.
 Luis Gilberto Murillo, former governor of Chocó and former Minister of Environment and Sustainable Development (Colombia Reborn). Murillo had been expected to be a pre-candidate for the Hope Center Coalition, but on 21 January 2022 he announced that he would run independently as the candidate for the Colombia Reborn (Spanish: Colombia Renaciente) party. He later stated that he had not felt welcome within the Hope Center Coalition. However, on 17 March he announced he would suspend his presidential bid to become the vice presidential nominee of the Hope Center Coalition.
Luis Pérez, former mayor of Medellín and former governor of Antioquia (Colombia Think Big). Pérez announced on 26 February 2021 that he would be running for the presidency as an independent candidate. On 15 December 2021, it was confirmed that Pérez had received the necessary number of signatures to be officially declared as a candidate. On 11 May 2022, Peréz withdrew his candidacy, citing a "hateful" and "polarised" political atmosphere. He stated that in the presidential debates, there is "no room for ideas, [but] only for insults and fights." Pérez also said that he intends to "return love to politics, so people do not vote out of fear".
 Íngrid Betancourt, former senator and member of the Oxygen Green Party. Betancourt announced her candidacy on 18 January 2022 and originally joined the Hope Center Coalition. However, following a dispute with fellow coalition pre-candidate Alejandro Gaviria, Betancourt declared on 29 January that she was leaving the coalition and would run as an independent candidate under her own Oxygen Green (Spanish: Verde Oxígeno) party. Following a poor showing in the polls, Betancourt withdrew from the race on 20 May 2022 and endorsed Hernández Suárez.

Campaign
The economist, former guerrilla, and former mayor of Bogotá, Gustavo Petro, previously a candidate in the 2010 and 2018 Colombian presidential elections, maintained a lead in most opinion polls and was set during the election to become the first president of Colombia from a left-wing coalition. In September 2021, Petro promised that he would retire from politics should his campaign for the presidency be unsuccessful. Petro said he would do so as he did not want to be an "eternal candidate". Of his campaign, Gwynne Dyer wrote: "Petro is a known quantity, active in politics for the past thirty years. He's not really radical, but he would be Colombia's first-ever president from the left, so for some Colombians his policies would seem extreme: things like expanding social programs, ending oil and gas exploration, and investing in agriculture." His political party, Humane Colombia, promoted the creation of the Historic Pact for Colombia coalition, which includes social movements, socialist, environmental, and feminist associations. The ideological diversity of the coalition was seen as a source of internal tension, and Petro tried to win over more of the middle class during his campaign, which led him to moderate his economic program and his criticism of the private sector, while trying to distance himself from Venezuela, which he previously supported; he maintained his position of re-establishing bilateral relations with the government of Nicolás Maduro. During the campaign, he was critical of the neoliberal system of the Colombian economy and its reliance on oil and gas, advocated progressive proposals on women's rights and LGBTQ issues, and supported a peace agreement between the state and the guerrillas. Proposals from Petro to change the nation's economic model by piling taxes on unproductive landowners, as well as abandoning oil and coal for clean energy, upset investors. Some feared his efforts to shift wealth from rich to poor could cause Colombia to become similar to present-day Venezuela. Critics claim his ideas are also similar to the early days of Hugo Chávez's government in Venezuela. Petro was critical of the Maduro government's commitment to oil usage whilst on the campaign trail. In an interview with Le Monde, Petro argued that "Maduro's Venezuela and Duque's Colombia are more similar than they seem", pointing to both governments' commitment to non-renewable energy and the "authoritarian drift" of the two. Regarding Chávez, Petro praised his efforts to bolster equality but said that Chávez "made a serious mistake of linking his social program to oil revenues". During the campaign, Petro and his running mate Francia Márquez faced numerous death threats from paramilitary groups. Petro cancelled rallies in the Colombian coffee region in early May 2022 after his security team uncovered an alleged plot by the La Cordillera gang. In response to this and other similar situations, 90 elected officials and prominent individuals from 20 countries signed an open letter expressing concern and condemnation of attempts of political violence against Márquez and Petro. The letter highlighted the assassination of over 50 social leaders, trade unionists, environmentalists, and other community representatives in 2022. Signatories of the letter included former Ecuadorian president Rafael Correa, American linguist and philosopher Noam Chomsky, and French member of the National Assembly Jean-Luc Mélenchon. Petro received the support of Luis Gilberto Murillo.

The conservative liberal coalition, Team for Colombia, made up of significant figures ranging from the centre, centre-right, and right-wing, was placed as second most voted in some opinion polls. The coalition was seen as having strong support among the upper socio-economic strata in the big cities. In August 2021, Federico Gutiérrez, the former popular mayor of Medellín, completed the formal act to formalize his candidacy for the presidency independently, by collecting signatures without the support of any political party or having the backing of recognized politicians such as Álvaro Uribe. As the Democratic Center party nominee Óscar Iván Zuluaga withdrew his own candidacy and endorsed Gutiérrez, his opponents attempted to link his candidacy to controversial party members, including the founder and former president Uribe and incumbent president Iván Duque, who suffered from high disapproval ratings. Gutiérrez also reportedly had lower name recognition than some of his opponents. In November 2021, Gutiérrez joined other former public servers in his coalition, along with Enrique Peñalosa, Juan Carlos Echeverry, Dilian Francisca Toro, David Barguil, and Alejandro Char. Gutiérrez took the second place in the polls at the end of October 2021. Due to his somewhat unexpected political success, he was invited to the debate of Prisa Media where he represented one of the three different political sectors of Colombia, debating with Petro and Fajardo. During the debate, Gutiérrez showed his opposition to Petro and gained favor among those who did not see Petro as the best option for Colombia. During the parliamentary elections on 13 March 2022, different consultations to elect a presidential candidate also took place. Gutiérrez and his coalition won first place with over 1.8 million votes, improving his chances of becoming President of Colombia in 2022. Gutiérrez received backing from the Liberal Party, the Conservative Party, the Party of the U, and the Radical Change party, which would have guaranteed him a majority in Congress if he was elected. Former president and Liberal Party chief César Gaviria explained his backing in a statement: "We are in total agreement that we must dedicate ourselves to the vulnerable, poor, marginalized people of this country, to the indigenous, the Afro-descendants, to young people." Gutiérrez also agreed to include anti-poverty and social development efforts in his manifesto, and a boost for education and health services. In May 2022, El Espectador published an article exposing the connections of Gutiérrez's campaign chief, Cesar Giraldo, to the mafia and drug traffickers.

The businessman and former mayor of Bucaramanga, Rodolfo Hernández Suárez, backed by the League of Anti-Corruption Governors, declared his candidacy in 2022 as an independent, with Marelen Castillo as his running-mate. He campaigned against the corruption of the traditional political class and emphasizing his image as a successful entrepreneur who can transform Colombia. He fully financed his own campaign, and promised to get rid of corruption in Colombia. He proposed to declare a state of emergency for 90 days and suspend all judicial and administrative functions "in order to address corruption". Dyer commented: "He will rule by decree, in other words, and he gets to choose who is arrested. It could end up as a populist dictatorship." He also promised major budget cuts, eliminating the use of presidential planes and helicopters, and donating all the money he would receive as president. He said he would give financial rewards to citizens who report corrupt state officials. He pledged to strengthen law and order and create jobs. He also praised Andrés Manuel López Obrador for his "anti-corruption efforts". He was dubbed as the "king of TikTok" on several occasions because of his large following and his extensive campaign during the 2022 presidential elections on TikTok. He did not claim to be on the right or the left; NACLA described his political position as a Realpolitik centrist, Reuters described him as centre-right, and other analysts struggled to label him. Also described as a populist, he was compared to Donald Trump and Silvio Berlusconi. He supports the decriminalization of abortion under certain circumstances, as well as the legalization of marijuana for medical use. He declared himself in favor of same-sex marriage, adoption of children by same-sex couples, and assisted suicide. His policies also included: lowering the value-added tax from 19% to 10%; a basic income for all senior citizens regardless of past contributions or lack thereof, and potentially those near or below the poverty line; progressively writing off debt for students in estrato 1 and 2 (both active students and those with the best grades); increased access to higher education in the regions; universal health care; switching from a punitive to a rehabilitative attitude towards drug addiction; granting Olympians and world record holders from the country state pensions; increasing social payments for successful sportspeople to up to COP100,000 per day; a 50% quota for women in public service and the presidential cabinet; welfare payments for those that maintain (rather than cut down) forested areas; and limiting fracking unless it meets environmental conditions. Regarding the Colombian peace process, Hernández stated his willingness to add an addendum to the FARC peace deal to include the National Liberation Army. He expressed support for a restoration of consular relations with Venezuela to address the violence on the border, saying: "Consular relations are necessary for good circulation, both commercial and touristic, and also because the border is where the increase in violence that Colombia is experiencing is also most felt." He received the backing of the third-placed candidate Gutiérrez for the second round, who urged voters "to keep Petro out".

Debates

Opinion polls

First round

Second round

Results 

Shortly after the first round, the process of judicial scrutiny commenced. The process found an increase of 0.1% votes, reportedly the lowest in Colombian history and slightly altered the final results for the initial round. As none of the presidential nominees obtained at least 50% of the votes, a runoff was held on 19 June 2022, between the top two candidates, Gustavo Petro and Rodolfo Hernández Suárez. Petro won the runoff, becoming the first left-wing candidate to be elected president of Colombia since the country's independence in 1810. The results for the second round saw the lowest record of blank votes in over 20 years. Furthermore, turnout for the run-off was 58.17%, the highest since 1998.

By department

First round

Second round

Abroad vote

First round

Second round

Aftermath
Hernández called Petro to congratulate him on his victory. He also encouraged Petro to remain committed to the "anti-corruption discourse". Hernández and Marelen Castillo also thanked Colombians that voted for them. Castillo announced shortly after the election that she would accept a seat in the chamber of representatives reserved for the second-place vice presidential candidate. She also encouraged Hernández to take a senate seat, although he was still to decide. On 23 June, Hernández announced that he would become a senator. President Iván Duque called Petro to congratulate him; he also pledged to carry out a smooth transition.

International state reactions
: President Alberto Fernández and Vice President Cristina Fernández de Kirchner both congratulated Petro and Márquez. President Fernández added that "[their] victory reafirms democracy and reasures the path toward a united Latin America".
: President Jair Bolsonaro did not congratulate Petro following his victory and criticized a speech by Petro where he advocated for the release of detained protestors. Bolsonaro used the speech to criticize left-wing opponent Luiz Inácio Lula da Silva, stating: "Did you see today's speech by the new president of Colombia? 'Release all the boys in prison, everyone'. Lula is going to release the little boys who killed someone for a cell phone to have a beer."
: Prime Minister Justin Trudeau congratulated Petro and Márquez, noting that the latter was "the first Afro-Colombian to take on the role". Trudeau also added that he is "looking forward to working with both on priorities like democracy, gender equality, and climate action".
: President Gabriel Boric congratulated Petro and called his victory "joy" for Latin America. Boric also congratulated Márquez and invited Petro to "work together for the unity of [Latin America] in a rapidly changing world."
: President Xi Jinping sent a congratulatory message to Petro, stating that the relationship between Colombia and China is at "a new starting point," expressed his willingness to work with Petro to "deepen mutual political trust," "practical cooperation" and "work on the further development of bilateral relations." Petro, via his Twitter account "thanked the President of China for his words, assuring "a productive relationship between Colombia and China based on overcoming the climate crisis and building fair and decarbonised economies."
: President Rodrigo Chaves Robles posted on Twitter, "congratulations to the President-elect of Colombia, Mr Gustavo Petro and his Vice-President Ms Francia Márquez, for [their] triumph, in a democratic and free process. Our best wishes to the Colombian people, with whom we wish a magnificent relationship."
: President Luis Abinader congratulated Petro on Twitter and praised the "civility shown on this day that supports democracy" and credited the electoral authorities for ensuring the election was "organised and peaceful".
: President Miguel Díaz-Canel congratulated Petro and posted on Twitter, "I express my fraternal congratulations to Gustavo Petro on his election as President of Colombia in a historic popular victory". Díaz-Canel also expressed interest in expanding bilateral relations between Colombia and Cuba. The Cuban foreign minister, Bruno Rodríguez Parrilla, also congratulated Petro. Rodríguez described the electoral triumph as a significant win for upholding peace in Colombia.
: President Guillermo Lasso called Petro to congratulate him. Lasso said he looked forward to strengthening "friendship...cooperation [and] development" between Colombia and Ecuador.
: The High Representative for Foreign Affairs Josep Borrell congratulated Petro, saying that "Colombia is a key partner for the EU" and that the president-elect can "count on the European Union" to continue strengthening their partnership. He also added that the Colombian election was "a vote for political change and a more egalitarian and inclusive society".
: Acting President Ariel Henry congratulated Petro and Márquez via Twitter and wrote, "I would like to extend my sincere congratulations to Mr Gustavo Petro on his victory in the presidential elections in Colombia. I wish you success, as well as your vice-president, Ms Francia Márquez."
: President Xiomara Castro posted on Twitter, "On behalf of the people of Honduras, I congratulate the brave people of Colombia for choosing the historic social change represented today by President-elect Gustavo Petro."
: President Andrés Manuel López Obrador described Petro's victory as a "historic event" and that it bought about an end to a period of "domination." Obrador also characterised Petro's triumph as a win for the "progressive bloc".
: In a social media post, President Laurentino Cortizo stated, "On behalf of Panama, I congratulate the president-elect of Colombia, Gustavo Petro, on his arrival at the Casa de Nariño."
: President Mario Abdo Benítez congratulated Petro on Twitter, writing, "Our congratulations to Gustavo Petro as the new president-elect of the Republic of Colombia and to the brotherly Colombian people for this exemplary election day that reaffirms their democratic commitment."
: President Pedro Castillo said he spoke with Petro to congratulate him on his "historic democratic victory", adding that he and Petro are "united by a common feeling that seeks collective, social and regional integration improvements for our peoples"
: Prime Minister Pedro Sánchez expressed his "best wishes" for Petro and Márquez. He also assured, "We will continue to strengthen the ties that unite us".
: Secretary of State Antony Blinken spoke with Petro to congratulate him on his election and discuss collaboration on issues such as "climate change, improv[ing] public health, and advanc[ing] inclusive economic opportunity". Blinken also noted "U.S. support for full implementation of Colombia's commitments under the 2016 Peace Accord". President Joe Biden also spoke with Petro to congratulate him. Biden noted that he "looks forward to working with the President-elect to continue strengthening bilateral cooperation, including on climate change, health security, and implementation of the 2016 Peace Accord" and discussed "bilateral security and counternarcotics cooperation". They also "agreed to have their teams follow up and engage directly on shared interests".
: President Luis Lacalle Pou called Petro to congratulate him. The Uruguayan ministry of foreign affairs wished Petro "success in his future management" and applauded the "exemplary electoral process".
: President Nicolás Maduro congratulated Petro on his victory, saying: "I congratulate Gustavo Petro and Francia Marquez, for the historic victory in the presidential elections in Colombia. The will of the Colombian people was heard, who came out to defend the path of democracy and peace. New times are on the horizon for this brother country."

Other international reactions 
Peruvian writer, politician, and Nobel laureate Mario Vargas Llosa declared "[Colombians] voted wrong, let's see how Petro acts." Ron DeSantis, the Republican Governor of Florida, denounced Petro as a "former narco-terrorist and a Marxist" whose victory is going to be "disastrous" for Colombia. In the United Kingdom, former Leader of the Labour Party, Jeremy Corbyn, praised Petro's victory as proof of the "power of community organising to build a popular policy platform to heal the divisions of the past and bring about social justice".

See also
2022 Colombian parliamentary election
Pink tide

Notes

References

Presidential
Colombia
Election
Election
Presidential elections in Colombia